Net 25 (capitalized and stylized as NET25) is a Philippine television network owned and operated by Eagle Broadcasting Corporation. The network is named for its flagship station in Metro Manila, DZEC-TV, which is carried on UHF Channel 25 on analog terrestrial TV and UHF Channel 28 on digital terrestrial TV and has carried by major cable operators in the country. The station's broadcast facilities are located at EBC Building #25 Central Ave., Barangay Culiat, New Era, Quezon City.

Net 25 reaches TV audiences on the Eastern and Pacific coasts, United States, Alaska and Hawaii and the whole of Asia including Singapore, Japan, South Korea, Hong Kong, Macau (in Portuguese), Taiwan, China, Vietnam (Hotel network) as well as Australia, New Zealand, the UK, Tajikistan, Turkey, France, Spain, Italy, Canada, Greece, Germany, Monaco, Switzerland, Iceland, Denmark, Norway, Finland, Sweden, the entire continent of Europe, and also reaches to the Middle East and North Africa (MENA) via OSN.

History
In July 2015, due to the onslaught of the INC leadership scandals, Net 25 was relaunched with the slogan I Am One With 25 (a secularly-altered version of the code for the INC's Executive Minister Eduardo Manalo, I Am One With EVM), for a new slogan of the network in line with its new programming thrusts through its support of the INC's Executive Minister Eduardo Manalo.

On October 4, 2020, Net 25 relaunched its logo retaining the "Net 25" 2014 wordmark, changing its color to gold and added the golden Philippine Eagle on the top. At the same time, Net 25 introduced its new programs such as Tagisan ng Galing, Happy Time, Kesayasaya, and EBC Music: #EnjoyMusicBeyondTheCrisis.

On October 31, 2021, Net 25 relaunched again its slogan as Let's Net Together sa Net 25 with a new station jingle and new station ID, re-imaging itself as a station targeting not only Iglesia ni Cristo members, but also a broader audience.

On February 8, 2022, Net 25 covered the campaign events of then-presidential candidate and former senator Bongbong Marcos and then-vice presidential candidate and then-Davao City mayor Sara Duterte held in the Philippine Arena, Ciudad de Victoria, Bocaue, Bulacan during the network's primetime news program, Mata ng Agila.

On December 5, 2022, Eric Quizon was tapped by EBC/Net 25 management to become the head of Net 25's newest talent management arm, NET25 Star Center.

Digital television

Net 25, with the help of GEMNET, had the first digital and full HD coverage of the 2010 Philippine elections via the ISDB-T system through their sister station's frequency, Channel 49. It also offered real-time election results via datacasting. However, the coverage was only available in some areas in the Philippines.

Programming

General programming
Net 25 also featured shows from DW-TV Germany. The channel also broadcast Korean dramas including The Snow Queen, Class 7 Civil Servant, Flower I Am, Never Twice, A Place in the Sun, and Fatal Promise.

Today, Net 25 focused on News, Public Affairs and Edutainment programming, similar to Sonshine Media Network International (SMNI), a broadcast arm of the Kingdom of Jesus Christ (KJC) led by international televangelist Pastor Apollo Quiboloy, Iglesia ni Cristo's long time rival.

Milestones

Net 25 Eagle News Service

Net 25 Eagle News Service (formerly known as Net 25 Integrated News and Current Affairs, Eagle News and also known as Net 25 News) is the network's official news, information and public affairs division of the whole Eagle Broadcasting Corporation. The Eagle News Service was created in November 2011 in order to compete with the news organizations of three major TV networks. The organization produces news and information content for the flagship TV station Net 25, flagship AM radio station DZEC Radyo Agila 1062 and the network's official online news portal.

Net 25 programs

Sa Ganang Mamamayan
Sa Ganang Mamamayan (lit. For Citizens) is the flagship morning talk show of Net 25, hosted by Congressman Rodante Marcoleta, Gen Subardiaga (anchor of Balitang Panggising of Radyo Agila on Pambansang Almusal and anchor of Agila Balita), and Nelson Lubao (anchor of Agila Pilipinas and Responde, a disaster preparedness show of Net 25). It airs every Monday to Friday at 10:00 (PST). The program pursues issues concerning the major public, and shares information garnered directly from the pertinent authorities.

See also
 Eagle Broadcasting Corporation

References

External links
 

Iglesia ni Cristo
Television networks in the Philippines
Television channels and stations established in 2000
Digital television stations in the Philippines
Religious television stations in the Philippines